VMware ThinApp (formerly Thinstall) is an application virtualization and portable application creator suite by VMware that can package conventional Windows applications so that they become portable applications by running on another operating system. According to VMware, the product has a success rate of about 90–95% in packaging applications.

History 
ThinApp (previously known as Thinstall) was originally developed by Jitit Inc. and was acquired by VMware on January 15, 2008. VMware later used the code name VMware Project North Star while the product was in beta. On June 10, 2008, VMware announced that the final name for the product was going to be VMware ThinApp. The trial version of Thinstall was initially available only to corporations, then VMware offered a public trial version.

Technology 
VMware ThinApp provides application virtualization. ThinApp is able to execute applications without them being installed in the traditional sense by virtualizing resources such as environment variables, files and Windows Registry keys. The virtual environment presented to the client is a merged view of the underlying physical and virtual resources, thereby allowing the virtualization layer to fool the application into thinking that it is running as if it were fully installed. ThinApp does not have any pre-installed components and does not require the installation of device drivers allowing applications to run from USB flash drives or network shares without ever requiring Administrator rights. ThinApp converts standard application installers such as .msi files into self-contained EXE files which includes everything required to run. Also it is able to scan a system before and after an application's installation and create a portable executable based upon changes made to the systems files and registry. Unlike self-extracting ZIP files, ThinApp does not extract files to disk or require system registry changes in order to run applications. ThinApp versions released after 5.2.3 drop support Windows XP and Windows Server 2003 and later.

Editions

The most "basic" version of ThinApp is "VMware ThinApp Starter Edition", offered for free with any purchase of VMware Workstation, while the most "advanced" version is "VMware ThinApp Enterprise Edition", which adds support for AppSync updating, Active Directory integration and allows usage by multiple users (both for the ThinApp Packager and ThinApp Client).

See also 
 Microsoft App-V
 Turbo (software)
 Software appliance
 Windows To Go
 Sandboxie
 Portable application creators

References

External links 
 

ThinApp
Virtualization software
Utilities for Windows